Dave McKenna (born 8 September 1987) is an Australian street bike stunt performer from Ballarat, Victoria.

Biography

Career 

Mckenna started his career at the age of 20, having watched street bike stunt riding in his teens, he took up the sport in 2007.
In 2013 he was the first Australian stunt performer to be signed by Yamaha Motor. The official partnership then launched the new Yamaha MT-09 in the Australian market with a full length TVC and custom stunt modified MT-09's.
Resident in Sydney, McKenna has performed at events such as the A1 Grand Prix, China Super bikes Championship, V8 Supercars, Moto GP, Nitro Championships, the Australian Tattoo and Body Expo, Ballarat Swap Meet, and York Motorcycle Festival.

Charities 
Having beaten cancer twice at a young age McKenna supports charities by participating in awareness raising performances for  organisations such as Make a Wish Foundation; Cancer Council Australia; the Sony Foundation and the Black Dog Ride.

Sponsors 
Yamaha Motor Australia, Shark Helmets, 
Ixon apparel, Yamalube,
Yamaha Motorcycle Insurance

See also 
 Stunt performer
 Motorcycle stunt riding
 Bicycle and motorcycle dynamics
 Wheelie
 Stoppie
 Weight transfer

References

External links
 Dave McKenna Facebook Fanpage
 Dave McKenna Youtube Channel

1987 births
Living people
Sportspeople from Ballarat
Motorcycle stunt performers
Australian motorsport people
Australian stunt performers
Sportsmen from Victoria (Australia)